Kampong Bunut is a village in Brunei-Muara District, Brunei, within Mukim Kilanas. It is also an area within the country's capital Bandar Seri Begawan. The population was 1,563 in 2016.

Facilities

Mosque 
Kampong Bunut Mosque is the village mosque and was inaugurated by His Majesty Sultan Hassanal Bolkiah on 16 July 1993. The mosque can accommodate 1,500 worshippers.

See also 
 Bunut Perpindahan

References 

Neighbourhoods in Bandar Seri Begawan
Villages in Brunei-Muara District